Kratzer may refer to:

People
 Adolf Kratzer (1893–1983), German theoretical physicist
 Alois Kratzer (1907–1990), German ski jumper
 Angelika Kratzer, German semanticist
 Ashley Kratzer (born 1999), American tennis player
 Dan Kratzer (born 1949), American football player
 Evi Kratzer (born 1961), Swiss cross-country skier
 Guy Kratzer (1941–2013), American politician from Pennsylvania
 Jean Kratzer (1906–2003), mayor of Vevey, Switzerland 1960–1976
 Leon Kratzer (born 1997), German basketball player
 Nicholas Kratzer (1487?–1550), German mathematician, astronomer, and horologist
 Rupert Kratzer (1945–2013), German cyclist
 Sophie Kratzer (1989–2020), German ice hockey player
 Tobias Kratzer (born 1980), German stage director

Other
 Kratzer (mountain), Bavaria, Germany
 14262 Kratzer (2000 AC125), a Main-belt Asteroid

Surnames from nicknames